Captain Ian Henry David Henderson  (2 October 1896 – 21 June 1918) was a British World War I flying ace credited with seven aerial victories.

Biography
He was the only son of Lieutenant-General Sir David Henderson, who served as Director-General of Military Aeronautics 1914–17, and as General Officer Commanding, Royal Flying Corps 1914–15, and his wife Dame Henrietta Caroline (née Dundas).

Henderson graduated from the Royal Military College, Sandhurst, on 13 January 1915, and was commissioned as a second lieutenant in the Princess Louise's (Argyll and Sutherland Highlanders) regiment. He was seconded to the Royal Flying Corps, and was appointed a flying officer on 21 August 1915.

He was promoted to lieutenant in his regiment on 21 January 1916, but had to wait until 1 June before receiving the same from the RFC. On 1 July he was appointed a flight commander with the acting rank of captain. Henderson was assigned to No. 19 Squadron, flying the B.E.12, gaining his first two victories in August, and was subsequently awarded the Military Cross, which was gazetted in October 1916. His citation read:

2nd Lieutenant (Temporary Captain) Ian Henry David Henderson, Argyll & Sutherland Highlanders.
For conspicuous gallantry and skill on several occasions. He drove down a machine out of control, and two days later dispersed six enemy machines which were attacking his formation. A few days later again he brought down an enemy biplane, the observer being apparently killed. A week after this he attacked and drove down another machine which had wounded his leader. He has also carried out several excellent contact patrols and attacked retiring artillery and a kite balloon.

Henderson had to wait until November for his third victory, gained while flying a SPAD S.VII. In 1917 he was posted to No. 56 Squadron, flying the S.E.5a, where in July, he shot down four Albatros D.Vs. He was appointed to the General Staff as a 3rd Grade Officer, remaining there until March 1918, when he was re-appointed a flight commander with the acting rank of captain. However, on 21 June 1918, he and Harold Redler were killed in a flying accident, when their Airco DH.9 crashed at Turnberry. He is buried at Doune Cemetery, Girvan, Ayrshire.

References

External links
Ian Henderson at The Aerodrome

1896 births
1918 deaths
Graduates of the Royal Military College, Sandhurst
Argyll and Sutherland Highlanders officers
Royal Flying Corps officers
Royal Air Force personnel of World War I
British World War I flying aces
Scottish flying aces
Recipients of the Military Cross
Aviators killed in aviation accidents or incidents in Scotland
Scottish airmen
Victims of aviation accidents or incidents in 1918
British military personnel killed in World War I